Edwin Christian "Ned" Schmidtke Jr. (born June 19, 1942) is an American film and television actor.  He played Greg Barnard on the U.S. TV show Another World.

Partial filmography

The Crazies (1973) - Sgt. Tragesser
Another World (1977–1978, TV Series) - Greg Barnard
First Steps (1985, TV Movie) - Dr. Chandler Phillips
The Manhattan Project (1986) - Jenny's Parent
Murder Ordained (1987, TV Movie) - Jeff Ellis
Rent-a-Cop (1987) - Lindy
Music Box (1989) - Dean Talbot
Shaking the Tree (1990) - Mr. Jack
The Babe (1992) - Hospital Reporter
Chain Reaction (1996) - Wisconsin Chief Schmidke
Early Edition (1996–1999, TV Series) - Ralph Stites / Mr. Roberts
The Relic (1997) - Capt. Martin
My Best Friend's Wedding (1997) - Captain
Tangled (1997) - Pauley
Mercury Rising (1998) - Senator
Roswell (2001, TV Series) - Pit Boss
The Practice (2001, TV Series) - Dr. Donald Sideman
The West Wing (2001–2002, TV Series) - Admiral, Navy Chief of Staff / Industry Leader #1
JAG (2001–2004, TV Series) - Congressman Harold Fetzer / Senior Member
Passions (2003, TV Series) - Dr. Wirtz
Fastlane (2003, TV Series) - Sheriff Groves
Crossing Jordan (2003, TV Series) - Richard Daniels
ER (2003, TV Series)
Uncle Nino (2003) - Executive
Malcolm in the Middle (2004, TV Series) - Manfred Schmidt
NYPD Blue (2004, TV Series) - Father McIntyre
Judging Amy (2004, TV Series) - Dr. Herrick Cohen
XXX: State of the Union (2005) - General Jack Pettibone
Wedding Crashers (2005) - Frank Meyers
Cold Case (2005, TV Series) - Art Balducci - 2005
Point Pleasant (2005–2006, TV Series) - Father Matthew
Without a Trace (2006, TV Series) - Greg the Minister
Huff (2006, TV Series) - Allen Meeks
Accepted (2006) - Dr. J. Alexander
The Unit (2006, TV Series) - Don Rohmer
NCIS: Naval Criminal Investigative Service (2006, TV Series) - Congressman Frank Getz
The Young and the Restless (2007, TV Series) - Lucas Hollenbeck
Jericho (2007, TV Series) - Reverend Frank Young
Dirt (2008, TV Series) - O'Connor
The Express: The Ernie Davis Story (2008) - Bill Clark
Medium (2008–2009, TV Series) - Terry Cavanaugh
Heroes (2009, TV Series) - Martin Gray
Numb3rs (2009, TV Series) - Roy Detchemendy (uncredited)
24 (2009, TV Series) - Dr. Lee Schulman
Criminal Minds (2010, TV Series) - Austin Chapman
Lie to Me (2010, TV Series) - Don Galpern
The Change-Up (2011) - Ted Norton

References

External links

1942 births
Living people
American male film actors
American male television actors
Beloit College alumni